

Karl Casper (22 February 1893 – 25 August 1970) was a general in the Wehrmacht of Nazi Germany during World War II who commanded several divisions. He was a recipient of the Knight's Cross of the Iron Cross.

Awards and decorations
 Iron Cross (1914) 2nd Class (4 August 1915) & 1st Class (26 November 1916)
 Wound Badge (1914) in Black (25 May 1918)
 Hanseatic Cross of Hamburg (24 July 1917)
 Honour Cross of the World War 1914/1918 (30 November 1934)
 West Wall Medal (20 March 1940)
 Clasp to the Iron Cross (1939) 2nd Class (23 May 1940) & 1st Class (11 June 1940)
 Honour Roll Clasp of the Army (22 July 1941)
 Infantry Assault Badge in Bronze (7 September 1941)
 Eastern Front Medal (18 July 1942)
 Wound Badge (1939) in Silver (5 October 1943)
 Knight's Cross of the Iron Cross on 22 September 1941 as Oberst and commander of 118th Infantry Regiment (mot.)

References

Citations

Bibliography

 
 

1893 births
1970 deaths
People from Diepholz (district)
Lieutenant generals of the German Army (Wehrmacht)
German Army personnel of World War I
Recipients of the clasp to the Iron Cross, 1st class
Recipients of the Knight's Cross of the Iron Cross
German prisoners of war in World War II held by the United States
People from the Province of Hanover
Military personnel from Lower Saxony